Azoulay, sometimes spelled Azoulai, Azulai or Azulay, etc. is a Sephardi Jewish surname, common among Jews of Moroccan descent.

People

Azoulay family of Fes
Azoulay, is the name of a notable Jewish family descended from Spanish exiles who, after the expulsion of the Jews from Spain in 1492 and following decades, settled in the city of Fez, Morocco. The family includes:
 Abraham Azulai ( 1570 – 1643) – Kabbalistic author and commentator best known for his Chessed le-Avraham
 Chaim Yosef David Azulai (1724–1807) – a rabbinical scholar and a noted bibliophile, who pioneered the history of Jewish religious writings.
 Raphael Isaiah Azulai (died 1830) – rabbi and writer.

Others
 André Azoulay – Senior adviser to King Mohammed VI of Morocco
 Audrey Azoulay – French Minister of Culture
 Blanche Azoulay - Algerian lawyer
 Daniel Azulay – Brazilian visual artist, comic book artist, and educator
 Shay K. Azoulay – Israeli writer
 Jean-Luc Azoulay – French filmmaker, see AB Disques
 Ariella Azoulay – Israeli scholar and documentarian, see Herzliya Biennial
 Jom Tob Azulay – Brazilian film producer and director
 Simon Azoulay Pedersen – Danish football player.
 Yinon Azulai, Israeli politician

See also
 Azoulay v. The Queen, landmark 1952 Canadian Supreme Court case, wherein Dr. Leon Azoulay was accused of murder after the death of a patient receiving an abortion
 The Policeman, Hashoter Azoulay was the original title of the Israeli film The Policeman

References

Sephardic surnames
Maghrebi Jewish surnames
Surnames of Moroccan origin
Kohenitic surnames